Queen of Clubs (translit. Dama spathi) is a 1966 Greek drama film directed by George Skalenakis. The film was selected as the Greek entry for the Best Foreign Language Film at the 39th Academy Awards, but was not accepted as a nominee.

Cast
 Elena Nathanail as Elena
 Spiros Focás as Alexandros
 Thodoros Roubanis as Vasilis (as Theo Roubanis)
 Despo Diamantidou as Marianthi
 Dimos Starenios as Teacher
 Aris Malliagros as Doctor

See also
 List of submissions to the 39th Academy Awards for Best Foreign Language Film
 List of Greek submissions for the Academy Award for Best Foreign Language Film

References

External links
 

1966 films
Greek drama films
1960s Greek-language films
1966 drama films
Greek black-and-white films
Films directed by George Skalenakis